Asphondylia betheli is a species of gall midge in the family Cecidomyiidae. This midge is widespread in the southwestern United States. The larvae of this species induce galls on in the fruit of Opuntia cacti.

This species was first described by American zoologist Theodore Cockerell in 1907.

References

Further reading

 
 

Cecidomyiinae
Articles created by Qbugbot
Insects described in 1907

Diptera of North America
Taxa named by Theodore Dru Alison Cockerell
Gall-inducing insects